Minuartia mediterranea is a species of plants in the family Caryophyllaceae (carpetweeds).

Sources

References 

mediteranea